Stolen Moments is the 15th studio album by Hong Kong singer Prudence Liew. This is the second in a series of three cover albums released by Liew in three different languages: the Mandarin album Love Addict was previously released in June 2011, and the English album Reincarnated Love released in July 2017.

Album information
The reasoning behind naming the album " Stolen Moments" is actually explained on the cover of the album:

Liew stated that she immensely enjoyed the recording session, hence a person and enjoyment combined to form the Chinese character "steal". In the liner notes, Liew explained that in the process of covering another person's work, besides paying the royalty fees to the record companies, no permissions were granted by the original artists, composers, and lyricists, and therefore is a form of stealing from their artistic moments.

Of the ten songs on the album, a more pop version of " (My Left and Right Hands)" was previously included on the Leslie Cheung tribute album, ReImagine Leslie Cheung released by Universal Music Hong Kong earlier in the year. The first printing of this album had the compact discs pressed in Germany at Arvato Bertelsmann to ensure the audio quality of the album was preserved. The album is released as a double album, with the second disc being a bonus DVD with music videos of all ten tracks.

Release and chart history
Universal Music Hong Kong promoted the album by releasing a triple single on June 1, 2012, of three tracks " (Blaming You For Being Too Beautiful)", " (Loving is More Important Than the Sky)", and " (Red Hot Lips)" for digital download and radio airplay. The songs did not chart on the major commercial radio stations, but all three songs charted on the MOOV Top 100 Singles Chart, the official Hong Kong digital singles download and online airplay chart, with " (Blaming You For Being Too Beautiful)" debuting within the top 20 at number 14, and the other two tracks charting in the top 40 for the week ending June 10, 2012.

The album was released on July 6, 2012, in Hong Kong. The album debuted on the HMV Cantonese/Mandarin Chart at number 6, and its Overall Sales Chart at number 19, the lowest debut positions for Liew since her return to music in 2008. However, for the week ending July 15, 2012, the album peaked at number 2 on the Cantonese/Mandarin Chart, and rose 12 positions to number 7 on the Overall Sales Chart.

Upon the release of the album, the single " (Loving is More Important Than the Sky)" jumped 66 places on the MOOV Top 100 Singles Chart, rising from number 72 to number 6, cracking the top 10 for the week ending July 15, 2012, and beating its original peak position of 29 back at the time of the single's release in June. Several non-single tracks also entered the chart that same week, briefly appearing in the lower half of the chart, before dropping out the next week.

Track listing

Chart peak positions

Album

Singles

Other charted songs

References

2012 albums
Prudence Liew albums
Cinepoly Records albums
Covers albums
Jazz albums by Hong Kong artists